Podolobium aestivum, is a flowering plant in the family Fabaceae and is endemic to New South Wales, Australia. It is an upright shrub with green spiky leaves and orange pea-like flowers.

Description
The flowers are borne in racemes in leaf axils, occasionally longer than the leaves, bracts  are oval-shaped and small.

Taxonomy and naming
Podolobium aestivum was first formally described in 1995 by Michael Crisp and Peter Henry Weston and the description was published Advances in Legume Systematics. The specific epithet (aestivum) means "pertaining to summer, and refers to the main flowering period".

Distribution and habitat
This podolobium grows on rocky locations in sclerophyll forest in the Gibraltar Range and on Mount Warning in New South Wales.

References

Fabales of Australia
Flora of New South Wales
aestivum
Plants described in 1995